Lamichhane is a surname found in Nepal. Used by Bahun, Chhetri, Magar & Gurung the origin of lamichhaney is from lamachhini village of west central nepal,  Some notable Lamichhane include:

Gopal Chandra Lamichhane (b. 1974)
Jiba Lamichhane, Nepalese businessman
Khagendra Lamichhane, Nepalese actor, writer and director
Rabi Lamichhane, Nepalese politician and journalist
Sandeep Lamichhane (b. 2000), Nepalese cricketer
Santosh Lamichhane, Nepalese writer
Sarita Lamichhane (b. 1975), Nepalese actress
Shankar Lamichhane, Nepalese writer
Pradeep Lamichhane, English Lecturer and Advocate, a young and dynamic youth leader

References

Ethnic groups in Nepal
Bahun
Nepali-language surnames
Khas surnames